Jaya Hartono (born 20 October 1963 in Medan, North Sumatera) is a football coach from Indonesia. He coached Persib Bandung from 2008 to 2010. He previously served as coach at Deltras Sidoarjo. He played football on clubs and the national team.

Playing career 
He played at the Galatama competition in the 1980s. He played on championship team Niac Mitra in 1987 and runner-up in 1989. He finished his career at Persik Kediri in 2000. He played for the following teams:
 Bintang Selatan Medan, 1978
 Bintang Utara Medan, 1979
 PSMS Medan, 1982
 Niac Mitra, 1984–1989
 Petrokimia Putra, 1989–1991
 BPD Jateng, 1991–1993
 Assyabaab Salim Group, 1993–1996
 Bontang FC, 1997
 Persisam Putra Samarinda, 1998
 Persik Kediri, 2000

Managerial career 
Jaya debuted on the national team in 1986, competing in the 1986 Asian Games. The team reached the semifinals, but were defeated by South Korea. He again played on the national team when it won the gold medal at the 1987 SEA Games and also on the Indonesia Independence Cup in 1986 with Robby Darwis.

References 

1963 births
Living people
Sportspeople from Medan
Indonesian footballers
PSMS Medan players
Indonesia international footballers
Persib Bandung managers
Footballers at the 1986 Asian Games
Southeast Asian Games gold medalists for Indonesia
Southeast Asian Games bronze medalists for Indonesia
Southeast Asian Games medalists in football
Association football defenders
Competitors at the 1987 Southeast Asian Games
Asian Games competitors for Indonesia
Indonesian football managers